Live Dangerously (Swedish: Lev farligt) is a 1944 Swedish drama film directed by and starring Lauritz Falk and also featuring Irma Christenson, Elof Ahrle and Stig Järrel. The film's sets were designed by the art director Nils Nilsson. It was one of a number of Swedish film made at the time set in occupied foreign countries which made a reference to German occupied Europe during World War II.

Cast
 Lauritz Falk as 	Iben Holt
 Irma Christenson as 	Inger Berg
 Elof Ahrle as 	Red Top
 Stig Järrel as 	Otto Frank
 Gunnar Björnstrand as 	Hahn
 Marianne Aminoff as 	Marion
 Ernst Eklund as 	Professor Fors
 Torsten Winge as Jacob
 Börje Mellvig as Dr. Fritz Lenner
 Rune Halvarsson as 	Johnny
 Olle Hilding as 	Olof
 Helge Mauritz as 	Train Engineer
 Erik Hell as 	Parachuting Saboteur
 Erik Strandmark as 	Corporal on the Train
 Holger Löwenadler as 	Train Engineer
 Sven Magnusson as Torsten
 Stig Olin as 	Parachuting Saboteur
 Mimi Nelson as 	Girl at Bar
 Birger Sahlberg as 	Gustav W. Tobiasson

References

Bibliography 
 Wright, Rochelle. The Visible Wall: Jews and Other Ethnic Outsiders in Swedish Film. SIU Press, 1998.

External links 
 

1944 films
Swedish drama films
1944 drama films
1940s Swedish-language films
Films directed by Lauritz Falk
Films based on Norwegian novels
1940s Swedish films